Veterans Bridge is a steel girder bridge that spans the Mississippi River in St. Cloud, Minnesota, United States. It was built in 1971 and was designed by Howard, Needles, Tammen & Bergendoff.

There have been three previous bridges at this location.  The first was built in 1867 by the St. Cloud Bridge Company and was a wooden toll bridge.  The city bought the bridge in 1887 and rebuilt it with iron and wood.  In 1894, the wooden bridge was replaced with a deck truss bridge, which survived until the new bridge was built in 1971.

See also
List of crossings of the Upper Mississippi River

References

Notes

Veterans Bridge, Mississippi River Highway Crossing, Saint Cloud, MN, Highways, Byways, And Bridge Photography, John A. Weeks III

Bridges completed in 1971
Bridges over the Mississippi River
Buildings and structures in St. Cloud, Minnesota
Monuments and memorials in Minnesota
Road bridges in Minnesota
Transportation in Stearns County, Minnesota
Former toll bridges in Minnesota
Steel bridges in the United States
Girder bridges in the United States